All Men Are the Same is a 1994 Spanish comedy film directed by Manuel Gómez Pereira.

Cast 
 Imanol Arias - Juan Luis
 Antonio Resines - Manolo
 Juanjo Puigcorbé - Joaquín 
 Cristina Marcos - Yoli
 María Barranco - Susana 
 Pastora Vega - Merche
 Kiti Mánver - Esther 
  - 
  - 
 Tito Valverde - César 
 Nancho Novo - Eduardo 
 Carmen Balagué - Pilar 
 Jesús Bonilla - Alberto 
 Isabel Ordaz - Lolita

References

External links 

1994 comedy films
1994 films
Spanish comedy films
1990s Spanish-language films
1990s Spanish films